Riponnensia splendens is a small metallic species of hoverfly. It is found in Europe.

Description
External images
For terms see Morphology of DipteraWing length 5·5–7 mm. Legs metallic green. 2 anterior longitudinal stripes of white dust on thorax dorsum. Antennomere 3 oval. 
See references for determination.

Distribution
Palearctic Netherlands South to Mediterranean basin, Ireland eastwards Central Europe and Southern Europe into Greece, Turkey, the Crimea and the Caucasus mountains.

Biology
Habitat deciduous woodland and scrub with streams and springs andscrub or along hedged streams in farmland. Flies June to September.

References

Diptera of Europe
Eristalinae
Insects described in 1882
Taxa named by Johann Wilhelm Meigen